Eugene Nikolayevich Sokolov (September 23, 1920 in Nizhny Novgorod – May 14, 2008 in Moscow), also known as Evgeny Nikolaevich Sokolow, Evgeny Nikolaevich Sokolov, Evgeni Sokolov, Ye. N. Sokolov, Evgeniĭ Sokolov, Yevgeny Nikolaevich Sokolov, and Yevgeniy Nikolaevich Sokolov, was a Russian researcher specialized in the field of neuroscience who worked at Moscow State University and founded the Soviet psychophysiology research. He is best known for his work on the orienting reflex and habituation. He authored Orienting Response Information on this subject.

He served as a lecturer at Cambridge and Oxford in 1969, was a visiting professor at the Massachusetts Institute of Technology since 1974, was elected to the National Academy of Sciences in 1975 as a foreign associate in the discipline of Psychological and Cognitive Sciences, and became an honorary member of the American Academy of Arts and Sciences in 1976. In 1984, he was elected to the Finnish Academy of Science and Letters and received the Pavlov Gold Medal Award from the Russian Academy of Sciences. In 1988, the Society for Psychophysiological Research awarded Sokolov a special diploma "for outstanding contributions to psychophysiology". In 1998 he was recognized by the International Organization of Psychophysiology as one of five most acclaimed neuroscientists of the twentieth century.

References 

20th-century Russian scientists
Russian neuroscientists
Moscow State University alumni
Academic staff of Moscow State University
1920 births
2008 deaths
People from Nizhny Novgorod
Academicians of the USSR Academy of Pedagogical Sciences
Foreign associates of the National Academy of Sciences
Soviet neuroscientists